Moult-Chicheboville is a commune in the department of Calvados, northwestern France. The municipality was established on 1 January 2017 by merger of the former communes of Moult (the seat) and Chicheboville. Moult-Argences station has rail connections to Caen and Lisieux.

Population

See also 
Communes of the Calvados department

References 

Communes of Calvados (department)
Populated places established in 2017
2017 establishments in France